Al-Iṣābah fī Tamyīz al-Ṣahābah (A Morning in the Company of the Companions) is a multivolume commentary Sunni hadith collection book by Ibn Hajar Al Asqalani. The book is acclaimed for chronicling the accounts of companions, those individuals who met and lived during the age of Muḥammad. The work includes the biography of Muḥammad, his companions' biographies, his wives' biographies, and the biographies of the tābiʿūn, the generation of believers who met and studied under the Ṣaḥābah. Although Ibn Hajar was Egyptian, the book is written in Arabic.

References 

15th-century books
Sunni literature
Hadith
Hadith collections
Mamluk literature